The 2014 Liga Nusantara Bangka Belitung season is the first edition of Liga Nusantara Bangka Belitung is a qualifying round of the 2014 Liga Nusantara.

Teams
Liga Nusantara Bangka belitung will be followed by six clubs namely Persipas Pangkalpinang, PS Bangka Tengah, Persibel Belitung, PS Belitung Timur, Bangka Selection, and Belitung F.C.

Result
Persipas Pangkalpinang is the winner.

References

Bangka Belitung